The 2001 Men's Intercontinental Cup was a qualifier for the 2002 Men's Hockey World Cup. It was held between 17–29 July 2001 in Edinburgh, Scotland. Argentina won the tournament after defeating Spain 5–4 in the final. Alongside Poland, Belgium, India, Japan and New Zealand, these seven teams qualified for the World Cup.

Qualification
Except for Oceania, all other four confederations received quotas for teams to participate allocated by the International Hockey Federation based upon the FIH World Rankings. Those teams participated at their respective continental championships but could not qualify through it, and they received the chance to qualify through this tournament based on the final ranking at each competition.

–Zimbabwe withdrew due to financial reasons. The FIH invited New Zealand instead to participate.

Results
All times are British Summer Time (UTC+01:00)

Preliminary round

Pool A

Pool B

Pool C

Pool D

Medal round

Pool E

Pool F

Classification round

Pool G

Pool H

Classification matches

Thirteenth to sixteenth place classification

Crossover

Fifteenth and sixteenth place

Thirteenth and fourteenth place

Ninth to twelfth place classification

Crossover

Eleventh and twelfth place

Ninth and tenth place

Fifth to eighth place classification

Crossover

Seventh and eighth place

Fifth and sixth place

First to fourth place classification

Crossover

Third and fourth place

Final

Final rankings

References

External links
Official website

Intercontinental Cup
Men's Intercontinental Cup (field hockey)
International field hockey competitions hosted by Scotland
Hockey World Cup Qualifier Men
Hockey World Cup Qualifier Men
Intercontinental Cup